René Monclova (born c. 1959) is a Puerto Rican actor. Monclova has been popular both with theater and television audiences. Mainly a comedian, Monclova has also played serious characters, a fact that might escape the minds of many Puerto Ricans, since he has become better known for his role as "Lolo Bond", a womanizing handyman, in El Condominio, a television show produced by Sunshine Logroño.

Biography
Many Puerto Ricans would use the popular phrase "he was born with an actor's pedigree" in Monclova's case, because both of his parents, Myrna Vázquez and Félix Monclova, were acting legends in Puerto Rico. His older brother, Eugenio Monclova, is also a well-known actor who co-starred with Martin Sheen in The Vessel (2016 film) . His godfather is Puerto Rican author and playwright René Marqués, whom he's named after.

Monclova spent his early childhood visiting Puerto Rico's television studios along with his family. Since he was a young child, Monclova knew he wanted to follow in his parents' footsteps someday. When he was 10 years old, Monclova appeared on his first play, an interpretation of Sacrificio en el Monte Moriah, a play authored by René Marqués. He would next appear on another play authored by Marqués, "Un Niño Azul para esa Sombra", working along Marta Romero.

Early on, Monclova participated in multiple high school plays. As the son of two legendary public figures, however, pressure was on him, as many among the general public wondered if he would ever become as famous as his parents. The fact that Monclova was not being hired during the late 1970s and early 1980s by any local television stations also proved to be somewhat troublesome for him as far as how he, as a "famous son", looked like in other people's minds.

Not being able to find television work, Monclova then became a professional theater actor, and he went on to act in countless theater plays, many of them at Teatro Tapia. Since Teatro Tapia was considered to be the best theater in Puerto Rico (and the hardest one where to act at) both by critics and play fans alike, Monclova impressed many with his performances there.

From 1990 to 1995 he got his first stable job working on the television program "Qué Vacilón" working alongside Puerto Rican comedian  Raymond Arrieta.

Monclova returned to theater, working at a prolific rate until his second shot at television stardom came: In 1992, producer Tony Mojena created a comedy named Los Apartamentos, which was shown on Telemundo. Monclova was cast as "Lolo".

The show became an instant hit, and Monclova finally found the television stardom that he had sought for such a long time. Los Apartamentos was such a hit that Monclova's name became a household one in Puerto Rico for the first time. Meanwhile, he also continued his theater acting career.

Around 1994, Mojena decided to cancel the show, and Sunshine Logroño took all the actors on the show and moved them to Televicentro, creating El Condominio ("The Condominium"). This move would later on prove to be very controversial.

Each of the actors got to reprise their old characters from Los Apartamentos at El Condominio. Meanwhile, El Condominio became such a hit that Logroño went on to produce a theatrical play of the same name, and Monclova and company visited most of Puerto Rico, taking their comedy to be seen live by residents of large cities and small towns alike.

By 2004, Monclova was one of the best known show business figures in Puerto Rico. His fame expanded to include Hispanic viewers in the United States when Televicentro debuted on DirecTV, including El Condominio among their programming to be sent by satellite to viewers in the United States.

Not long after El Condominio began to be seen in the United States, Mojena returned, taking Logroño to court, claiming that Logrono owed him money for allegedly stealing his show and his characters and making a profit with them. That situation erupted in a wide media controversy in Puerto Rico, with rumors that the show would eventually be cancelled. However, a judge decided that the show will be kept on the air for as far as a decision hasn't been reached. The case, is now in the working stage in the appellate courts in Boston, Massachusetts.

Monclova quickly defended Logroño, becoming sorts of a leader for the group of actors that have been working for more than a decade alongside him on television. In a 2005 television interview between El Condominio'''s cast and Luis Francisco Ojeda, Monclova publicly showed disappointment at Mojena's alleged claims that the show's characters belonged to him. Monclova told Ojeda that "a character belongs to an actor, not to a producer".

Monclova continued reprising "Lolo" in Club Sunshine, Por El Casco De San Juan, a retooling the long-running, yet canceled sitcom El Condominio, which also features a couple of familiar faces from there, and several variety shows after leaving Club Sunshine. In 2014, he joined Raymond Arrieta and Jorge Castro in the WKAQ-TV sketch comedy, Raymond y Sus Amigos''.

Monclova is an active stage actor in the San Juan theater scene. For years his voice has been frequently heard in radio and TV commercial spots and also at the recorded welcome introduction to the movies exhibited at Caribbean Cinemas movie theaters.

See also
 
 List of Puerto Ricans
 French immigration to Puerto Rico

References

External links
Comic photo of Monclova as "Lolo"

Puerto Rican male actors
Puerto Rican male stage actors
Puerto Rican male television actors
Puerto Rican comedians
1965 births
Living people
21st-century American comedians